The 2009–10 CEV Cup was the 38th edition of the European CEV Cup volleyball club tournament. 

Italian club Bre Banca Lannutti Cuneo beat Russian club Iskra Odintsovo in the finale. Belgian player Wout Wijsmans was awarded Most Valuable Player of the tournament.

Participating teams

¹ The Spanish club Tarragona SPiSP withdrew from the European Cups 2009/2010.

Main phase

16th Finals
The 16 winning teams from the 1/16 Finals will compete in the 1/8 Finals playing Home & Away matches. The losers of the 1/16 Final matches will qualify for the 3rd round in Challenge Cup.

|}

First leg

|}

Second leg

|}

8th Finals

|}

First leg

|}

Second leg

|}

4th Finals

|}

First leg

|}

Second leg

|}

Challenge phase

|}

First leg 

|}

Second leg 

|}

Final phase
Venue:  Lotto Dôme, Maaseik

Semi finals

|}

3rd place

|}

Final

|}

Final standing

Awards

Most Valuable Player
  Wout Wijsmans (Bre Banca Lannutti Cuneo)
Best Setter
  Nikola Grbić (Bre Banca Lannutti Cuneo)
Best Receiver
  Bert Derkoningen (Noliko Maaseik)
Best Libero
  Hubert Henno (Bre Banca Lannutti Cuneo)

Best Blocker
  Simon Van de Voorde (Noliko Maaseik)
Best Spiker
  Jochen Schöps (Iskra Odintsovo)
Best Server
  Wout Wijsmans (Bre Banca Lannutti Cuneo)
Best Scorer
  Jochen Schöps (Iskra Odintsovo)

References

External links
CEV Website

2009-10
2009 in volleyball
2010 in volleyball